Ashutosh Sharma may refer to:

 Colonel Ashutosh Sharma, Indian Army officer killed in action in May 2020
 Ashutosh Sharma (scientist), Professor at the Indian Institute of Technology Kanpur
 Ashutosh Sharma (cricketer), Indian cricketer
 Ashutosh Sharma (biotechnologist), Director of Regional Department of Bio-engineering at the Tecnologico de Monterrey